North Carolina Highway 58 (NC 58) is a primary state highway in the U.S. state of North Carolina that traverses the state's Coastal Plain. The route links many of the Crystal Coast communities along its eastern segment. Its southern terminus is at the visitor center parking lot for Fort Macon State Park in Atlantic Beach and its northern terminus is at the intersection of US 401 and US 158 Business in Warrenton. The highway traverses nearly the entire length of the Bogue Banks and serves the major cities of Kinston, Snow Hill, and Wilson.

Route description

NC 58 begins from the visitor center parking lot at Fort Macon State Park--formerly County Road 1190--and begins heading west along Bogue Banks. It passes through Atlantic Beach, Pine Knoll Shores, Indian Beach, and Emerald Isle as it runs along the Bogue Banks as a main highway. Approaching the west end, the highway turns north and crosses on the Emerald Island Causeway. Running by Cedar Point, the highway intersects NC 24 and then heads toward the northwest as it passes by the White Oak River Mechanical Harvesting of Oysters Prohibited Area. The route then approaches Maysville and runs concurrent with US 17 heading north until reaching Pollocksville where NC 58 splits from US 17 heading west. NC 58 then enters Kinston and runs concurrent with US 70 until reaching the intersection with US 258, where the route turns to the north and runs concurrent with US 70 Bus. and US 258 Bus., crossing over the Neuse River via Frederick Jones Bridge. Heading through downtown, the highway begins running concurrently with NC 11 until reaching the intersection with Vernon Avenue, where NC 58 splits from US 70 Bus., US 258 Bus. and NC 11. NC 11 heads east while the business routes head west.

The route then continues north after exiting Kingston and intersects NC 123 and US 258 before entering Snow Hill. The highway then continues northwest and intersects and runs concurrent with NC 222 through Stantonsburg. Exiting town, the highway intersects NC 42, a belt route around Wilson as it exits town. Heading north towards Nashville, NC 58 intersects NC 97 and crosses over Interstate 95 but does not have direct access to the freeway. It interchanges US 64 (future Interstate 87 corridor). The highway then continues north and passes through Castalia before intersecting the eastern terminus of NC 56. Then, NC 58 intersects NC 43 before entering Warrenton, running concurrent with US 158 Bus. and then reaching its northern terminus at US 401.

Major intersections

References

External links

NCRoads.com: N.C. 58

058
Transportation in Carteret County, North Carolina
Transportation in Jones County, North Carolina
Transportation in Lenoir County, North Carolina
Transportation in Greene County, North Carolina
Transportation in Wilson County, North Carolina
Transportation in Nash County, North Carolina
Transportation in Franklin County, North Carolina
Transportation in Warren County, North Carolina